The "Reds" (Polish: Czerwoni) were a faction of the Polish insurrectionists during the January Uprising in 1863. They were radical democratic activists who supported the outbreak of the uprising from the outset, advocated an end to serfdom in Congress and future independent Poland, without compensation to the landlords, land reform and other substantial social reforms. This contrasted them with the "White" faction, which only came to support the Uprising after it was already under way, and which, while also strongly supporting an end to serfdom wanted to compensate the landowners.

In general, the Reds represented liberal intellectuals while the Whites based their support on progressive landlords. The Reds were based in Warsaw and concentrated around the Warsaw Medical Academy, while the Whites' base of support was in Kraków. The Central National Committee (Komitet Centralny Narodowy) formed the leadership basis of the faction.

Notable members

Oskar Awejde
Stefan Bobrowski
Jarosław Dąbrowski
Apollo Korzeniowski
Agaton Giller
Ludwik Mierosławski
Zygmunt Padlewski
Bronisław Szwarce

References

January Uprising